The Texas barrier islands are a chain of barrier islands in the Gulf of Mexico along the Texas Gulf Coast. The islands enclose a series of estuaries along the Texas coast and attract tourists for activities such as recreational fishing and dolphin watching. The seven barrier islands, listed from northeast to southwest, are Galveston Island, Follet's Island, Matagorda Island, San José Island, Mustang Island, Padre Island, and Brazos Island.

List of islands

References

External links